Albert Brancato (May 29, 1919 – June 14, 2012) was a shortstop and third baseman in Major League Baseball who played for the Philadelphia Athletics from 1939 to 1941 and in 1945.

His career in the majors was interrupted by military service in the U.S. Navy during World War II. Brancato served in the Pacific theater and played on the Navy's all-star baseball team, composed of Major League players in military service. While entertaining the troops at the all-star games, Brancato appeared alongside Joe DiMaggio, Phil Rizzuto, Bill Dickey, Tom Ferrick, Bob Feller, and Eddie Collins, Jr. He was born in Philadelphia, one of seven children of Italian immigrant parents.

Brancato died on June 14, 2012, at age 93 at Sunrise at Granite Run, an assisted living facility in Delaware County, Pennsylvania. He had recently moved to the facility in failing health and had broken his hip several months before his death. He was a long-time resident of Upper Darby, Pennsylvania with his wife, Isabel, to whom he was married for 69 years. His children included Sister Helen Brancato, Albert Jr., and David Brancato.

References

External links

Philadelphia Athletics Historical Society

1919 births
2012 deaths
South Philadelphia High School alumni
American expatriate baseball players in Canada
United States Navy personnel of World War II
Baseball players from Philadelphia
Elmira Pioneers players
Fort Worth Cats players
Greenville Spinners players
Louisville Colonels (minor league) players
Major League Baseball shortstops
Minor league baseball managers
Philadelphia Athletics players
Saint Joseph's Hawks baseball coaches
St. Paul Saints (AA) players
Toronto Maple Leafs (International League) players
United States Navy sailors
Williamsport Grays players